The double-deficit theory of dyslexia proposes that a deficit in two essential skills gives rise to the lowest level of reading performances, constituting the most severe form of dyslexia.

Reading ability
The ability to read is believed to depend on two skills:

Phonological processing skills make up the ability to identify and manipulate sounds in speech.
Rapid automatized naming compose the ability to translate visual information whether of letters, objects or pictures into a phonological code.

References

Special education
Educational psychology
Learning disabilities
Theories of dyslexia